Heidelberg railway station is located on the Hurstbridge line in Victoria, Australia. It serves the north-eastern Melbourne suburb of Heidelberg, and opened on 8 May 1888.

History
Heidelberg station opened on 8 May 1888, at a time when it was the terminus station on what is now the Hurstbridge line. On 1 September 1913, the current island station design officially opened.

At one time, there was a goods yard opposite Platform 1. It made way for an extension of the commuter car park, although the goods shed still exists. At one time, there were three tracks running through the station; two served the island platform, and the third track was the last surviving stabling track. The third track was removed after a period of disuse.

Between 26 January 1942 and 6 February 1942, fourteen trains were modified to become ambulance trains. They ferried returning wounded World War II servicemen from Melbourne to Heidelberg, where ambulances were waiting to collect them. On 3 November 1995, 50 years after the end of the conflict, Vin Heffernan, the member for Ivanhoe, unveiled a plaque at the station to commemorate the role of the station in the war effort.

During 1988, the former No. 4 and No. 5 tracks were abolished, along with a number of disc signal posts.

In 1992, the station received an enclosed waiting area and ticket facilities, as part of the "Travel Safe" program of the early 1990s. At 5am on 5 March 1994, after the signals were upgraded to an electronic system, one of the decommissioned mechanical semaphore signals ("Signal No. 4") was relocated from the Melbourne side of the station, to the car park opposite Platform 1, for display purposes. Signal No. 4 was first erected for operation at Heidelberg in 1912. On 21 June 1996, Heidelberg was upgraded to a Premium Station.

At the 2016/17 Victorian State Budget, $140.2 million was allocated to duplicate the single track between Heidelberg and Rosanna, and included a second rail tunnel, alongside the existing tunnel. In May 2018, the project was completed.

Platforms and services
Heidelberg has one island platform with two faces. It is served by Hurstbridge line trains.

Platform 1:
  all stations and limited express services to Flinders Street

Platform 2:
  all stations and limited express services to Macleod, Greensborough, Eltham and Hurstbridge

Transport links
Dysons operates three routes via Heidelberg station, under contract to Public Transport Victoria:
 : Eltham station – Glenroy station (via Lower Plenty)
 : Eltham station – Glenroy station (via Greensborough)
 : to Melbourne University (off-peak extension to Queen Victoria Market)

Kinetic Melbourne operates one SmartBus route via Heidelberg station, under contract to Public Transport Victoria:
  : Altona station – Mordialloc

Ventura Bus Lines operates one route to and from Heidelberg station, under contract to Public Transport Victoria:
 : to La Trobe University Bundoora Campus

References

External links
 
 Melway map at street-directory.com.au

Premium Melbourne railway stations
Railway stations in Melbourne
Railway stations in Australia opened in 1888
Heidelberg, Victoria